Susan Hatch Davis is an American politician from Vermont. A member of the Vermont Progressive Party, she was a candidate in the 2022 Vermont gubernatorial election. before withdrawing from the race. The Progressive Party ended up endorsing Brenda Siegel, a Democrat who would ultimately lose the race to Phil Scott

In 2016, Davis was endorsed by Bernie Sanders. In 2020, Davis entered a primary election against Mark MacDonald, but ultimately pulled out of the race and endorsed MacDonald.

Davis represented Orange-1 District in the Vermont House of Representatives from 2007 to 2017. She lives in Washington, Vermont.

References 

21st-century American politicians
21st-century American women politicians
Living people
Members of the Vermont House of Representatives
People from Washington, Vermont
Vermont Progressive Party politicians
Women state legislators in Vermont
1953 births